Andy Raymond is an Australian sports commentator, Event Host and Podcaster.

Born in Sydney, Andy Raymond is the son of former Channel 7 motor sports commentator Mike Raymond who was best known for his long time hosting of Seven's Australian Touring Car Championship and Bathurst 1000 telecasts from the 1970s to the mid 1990s as well as being the promoter and co-operator of the Liverpool Speedway in Sydney. He is also the nephew of former Channel 10 television host Steve Raymond.

Following his father and uncle into broadcast journalism, Raymond's first foray into the public eye came as a pit reporter at Bathurst during the early 1990s, taking over the role from Neil Crompton who at the time was concentrating more on his race driving than commentating.

During his tenure at 7 he also worked on golfing, swimming and tennis broadcasts as well as serving as sideline commentator in the inaugural Super Rugby competition.

In 1997 Raymond joined Fox Sports and apart from working on Fox Sports News he covered just about every sport in the country at one time or another in his 23 years there. He is widely known for his commentary on the NRL and Boxing where he established himself as a knowledgeable, professional and a highly entertaining voice during growth periods for both sports.

It's his voice that is etched in the minds of many, complementing the wonderful athletic achievements that make up many memorable moments in Australian Sporting history.

In more recent years Raymond established himself as the industries leading sideline commentator in the NRL with a unique ability to constantly bring out the best in players with his classy interview style, and always with a smile. Respected by the players and coaches and enjoyed by the TV audience it came as a surprise to many he was let go from Fox Sports due to COVID-19 cutbacks in April 2020.

In September 2020, he launched a Podcast Andy Raymond #UNFILTERED.

From 21 December 2002 to 2005 he promoted the annual Australian Wrestling Supershow on Fox Sport was held at the State Sports Centre.

References

External links

External links 

 

1975 births
Living people
Australian sports journalists
Australian rugby league journalists
Australian rugby league commentators
Australian television personalities
Mixed martial arts broadcasters
Kickboxing commentators
Mixed martial arts people
Boxing commentators
Australian boxing promoters
Color commentators
Australian Freemasons
Professional wrestling announcers
Professional wrestling promoters